Robert Bermingham Clements, Viscount Clements (May 1805 – 24 January 1839) was an Irish politician.

The son of the Earl of Leitrim, Clements grew up at Rynne, County Leitrim.  He served as a captain in the Prince of Wales's Militia, based in County Donegal.  At the 1826 UK general election, he stood as a Whig in Leitrim.  He won the seat, and held it in 1830, but lost it at the 1831 UK general election.  At the 1832 UK general election, he won it back, and held it in 1835 and 1837, serving until his death in 1839.  He was succeeded both as Viscount Clements and in Parliament by his younger brother.

References

1805 births
1839 deaths
Robert Bermingham
Members of the Parliament of the United Kingdom for County Leitrim constituencies (1801–1922)
People from County Leitrim
UK MPs 1826–1830
UK MPs 1830–1831
UK MPs 1832–1835
UK MPs 1835–1837
UK MPs 1837–1841
Whig (British political party) MPs for Irish constituencies